In imaging spectroscopy (also hyperspectral imaging or spectral imaging) each pixel of an image acquires many bands of light intensity data from the spectrum, instead of just the three bands of the RGB color model. More precisely, it is the simultaneous acquisition of spatially coregistered images in many spectrally contiguous bands.

Some spectral images contain only a few image planes of a spectral data cube, while others are better thought of as full spectra at every location in the image.  For example, solar physicists use the spectroheliograph to make images of the Sun built up by scanning the slit of a spectrograph, to study the behavior of surface features on the Sun; such a spectroheliogram may have a spectral resolution of over 100,000 and be used to measure local motion (via the Doppler shift) and even the magnetic field (via the Zeeman splitting or Hanle effect) at each location in the image plane.  The multispectral images collected by the Opportunity rover, in contrast, have only four wavelength bands and hence are only a little more than 3-color images.

One application is spectral geophysical imaging, which allows quantitative and qualitative characterization of the surface and of the atmosphere, using radiometric measurements.  These measurements can then be used for unambiguous direct and indirect identification of surface materials and atmospheric trace gases, the measurement of their relative concentrations, subsequently the assignment of the proportional contribution of mixed pixel signals (e.g., the spectral unmixing problem), the derivation of their spatial distribution (mapping problem), and finally their study over time (multi-temporal analysis). The Moon Mineralogy Mapper on Chandrayaan-1 was a geophysical imaging spectrometer.

Background 
In 1704, Sir Isaac Newton demonstrated that white light could be split up into component colours. The subsequent history of spectroscopy led to precise measurements and provided the empirical foundations for atomic and molecular physics (Born & Wolf, 1999). Significant achievements in imaging spectroscopy are attributed to airborne instruments, particularly arising in the early 1980s and 1990s (Goetz et al., 1985; Vane et al., 1984). However, it was not until 1999 that the first imaging spectrometer was launched in space (the NASA Moderate-resolution Imaging Spectroradiometer, or MODIS).

Terminology and definitions evolve over time.  At one time, >10 spectral bands sufficed to justify the term "imaging spectrometer" but presently the term is seldom defined by a total minimum number of spectral bands, rather by a contiguous (or redundant) statement of spectral bands.

The term hyperspectral imaging is sometimes used interchangeably with imaging spectroscopy. Due to its heavy use in military related applications, the civil world has established a slight preference for using the term imaging spectroscopy.

Unmixing 
Hyperspectral data is often used to determine what materials are present in a scene.  Materials of interest could include roadways, vegetation, and specific targets (i.e. pollutants, hazardous materials, etc.).  Trivially, each pixel of a hyperspectral image could be compared to a material database to determine the type of material making up the pixel.  However, many hyperspectral imaging platforms have low resolution (>5m per pixel) causing each pixel to be a mixture of several materials.  The process of unmixing one of these 'mixed' pixels is called hyperspectral image unmixing or simply hyperspectral unmixing.

Models 

A solution to hyperspectral unmixing is to reverse the mixing process.  Generally, two models of mixing are assumed: linear and nonlinear.
Linear mixing models the ground as being flat and incident sunlight on the ground causes the materials to radiate some amount of the incident energy back to the sensor.  Each pixel then, is modeled as a linear sum of all the radiated energy curves of materials making up the pixel.  Therefore, each material contributes to the sensor's observation in a positive linear fashion.  Additionally, a conservation of energy constraint is often observed thereby forcing the weights of the linear mixture to sum to one in addition to being positive.  The model can be described mathematically as follows:

This type of model is also referred to as a simplex.

With  satisfying the two constraints:
1. Abundance Nonnegativity Constraint (ANC) - each element of x is positive.
2. Abundance Sum-to-one Constraint (ASC) - the elements of x must sum to one.

Non-linear mixing results from multiple scattering often due to non-flat surface such as buildings and vegetation.

Unmixing (Endmember Detection) Algorithms

There are many algorithms to unmix hyperspectral data each with their own strengths and weaknesses.  Many algorithms assume that pure pixels (pixels which contain only one materials) are present in a scene.
Some algorithms to perform unmixing are listed below:

 Pixel Purity Index  Works by projecting each pixel onto one vector from a set of random vectors spanning the reflectance space.  A pixel receives a score when it represent an extremum of all the projections.  Pixels with the highest scores are deemed to be spectrally pure.
 N-FINDR 
 Gift Wrapping Algorithm
 Independent Component Analysis Endmember Extraction Algorithm - works by assuming that pure pixels occur independently than mixed pixels.  Assumes pure pixels are present.
 Vertex Component Analysis - works on the fact that the affine transformation of a simplex is another simplex which helps to find hidden (folded) vertices of the simplex. Assumes pure pixels are present.
 Principal component analysis - could also be used to determine endmembers, projection on principal axes could permit endmember selection [Smith, Johnson et Adams (1985), Bateson et Curtiss (1996)]
 Multi endmembers spatial mixture analysis based on the SMA algorithm
 Spectral phasor analysis based on Fourier transformation of spectra and plotting them on a 2D plot.
 
Non-linear unmixing algorithms also exist: support vector machines or analytical neural network.

Probabilistic methods have also been attempted to unmix pixel through Monte Carlo unmixing algorithm.

Abundance Maps

Once the fundamental materials of a scene are determined, it is often useful to construct an abundance map of each material which displays the fractional amount of material present at each pixel.  Often linear programming is done to observed ANC and ASC.

Sensors
Planned

 EnMAP

Current and Past

AVIRIS — airborne
MODIS — on board EOS Terra and Aqua platforms
MERIS — on board Envisat
Hyperion — on board Earth Observing-1
Several commercial manufacturers for laboratory, ground-based, aerial, or industrial imaging spectrographs

See also 

 Remote sensing
 Hyperspectral imaging
 Full Spectral Imaging
 List of Earth observation satellites
 Chemical Imaging
 Imaging spectrometer
 Infrared Microscopy
 Phasor approach to fluorescence lifetime and spectral imaging
 Video spectroscopy

References 

 Goetz, A.F.H., Vane, G., Solomon, J.E., & Rock, B.N. (1985) Imaging spectrometry for earth remote sensing. Science, 228, 1147.
 Schaepman, M. (2005) Spectrodirectional Imaging: From Pixels to Processes. Inaugural address, Wageningen University, Wageningen (NL).
 Vane, G., Chrisp, M., Emmark, H., Macenka, S., & Solomon, J. (1984) Airborne Visible Infrared Imaging Spec-trometer (AVIRIS): An Advanced Tool for Earth Remote Sensing. European Space Agency, (Special Publication) ESA SP, 2, 751.

External links 

 About imaging spectroscopy (USGS): http://speclab.cr.usgs.gov/aboutimsp.html
 Link to resources (OKSI): http://www.techexpo.com/WWW/opto-knowledge/IS_resources.html
 Special Interest Group Imaging Spectroscopy (EARSeL): https://web.archive.org/web/20051230225147/http://www.op.dlr.de/dais/SIG-IS/SIG-IS.html
 Applications of Spectroscopic and Chemical Imaging in Research: http://www3.imperial.ac.uk/vibrationalspectroscopyandchemicalimaging/research
 Analysis tool for spectral unmixing : http://www.spechron.com

Spectroscopy